Malaysia–Tunisia relations refers to bilateral foreign relations between Malaysia and Tunisia. Diplomatic relations established on 1957. The Malaysian Embassy in Algiers covers Tunisia while the Tunisian Embassy in Jakarta covers Malaysia. The relations are mainly in economic relations with several agreements has been signed.

Economic relations 
In 1993, trade relations between the two countries stood at MYR16.47 million with Malaysian export reach MYR12.49 million while Tunisian export reach around MYR3.98 million. In 2013, Tunisia invited any investments from Malaysian companies especially in the development of their city in Sfax. Besides that, Tunisia is also keen to invest in Malaysia especially in Islamic banking and halal products.

Education relations 
In education, Tunisia has offered places for Malaysian students in Ez-Zitouna University while Malaysia provided places for Tunisian students in the International Islamic University Malaysia.

References 

 
Tunisia
Bilateral relations of Tunisia